Thermoception or thermoreception is the sensation and perception of temperature, or more accurately, temperature differences inferred from heat flux. It deals with a series of events and processes required for an organism to receive a temperature stimulus, convert it to a molecular signal, and recognize and characterize the signal in order to trigger an appropriate defense response. 

Thermoception in larger animals is mainly done in the skin; mammals have at least two types. The details of how temperature receptors work are still being investigated.  Ciliopathy is associated with decreased ability to sense heat, thus cilia may aid in the process.  Transient receptor potential channels (TRP channels) are believed to play a role in many species in sensation of hot, cold, and pain.  Vertebrates have at least two types of sensor: those that detect heat and those that detect cold.

In animals

A particularly specialized form of thermoception is used by Crotalinae (pit viper) and Boidae (boa) snakes, which can effectively see the infrared radiation emitted by hot objects. The snakes' face has a pair of holes, or pits, lined with temperature sensors.  The sensors indirectly detect infrared radiation by its heating effect on the skin inside the pit. They can work out which part of the pit is hottest, and therefore the direction of the heat source, which could be a warm-blooded prey animal. By combining information from both pits, the snake can also estimate the distance of the object.

The Common vampire bat has specialized infrared sensors in its nose-leaf. Vampire bats are the only mammals that feed exclusively on blood. The infrared sense enables Desmodus to localize homeothermic (warm-blooded) animals (cattle, horses, wild mammals) within a range of about 10 to 15 cm. This infrared perception is possibly used in detecting regions of maximal blood flow on targeted prey.

Other animals with specialized heat detectors are forest fire seeking beetles (Melanophila acuminata), which lay their eggs in conifers freshly killed by forest fires. Darkly pigmented butterflies Pachliopta aristolochiae and Troides rhadamantus use specialized heat detectors to avoid damage while basking. The blood sucking bugs Triatoma infestans may also have a specialised thermoception organ.

A 2020 paper has demonstrated that dogs, like vampire bats, can detect weak thermal radiation with their rhinaria (noses).

In humans
In humans, temperature sensation from thermoreceptors enters the spinal cord along the axons of Lissauer's tract that synapse on second order neurons in grey matter of the dorsal horn. The axons of these second order neurons then decussate, joining the spinothalamic tract as they ascend to neurons in the ventral posterolateral nucleus of the thalamus.
A study in 2017 shows that the thermosensory information passes to the lateral parabrachial nucleus rather than to the thalamus and this drives thermoregulatory behaviour.

Nobel Prize 2021 
The Nobel Prize in Physiology or Medicine in 2021 was attributed to David Julius (professor at the University of California, San Francisco, USA) and Ardem Patapoutian (neuroscience professor at Scripps Research in La Jolla, California, USA) "for their discovery of receptors for temperature and touch".

See also 
 Infrared sensing in snakes
 Infrared sensing in vampire bats
 List of Nobel laureates in Physiology or Medicine#Laureates

Notes

References

External links
 A. Campbell, R. R. Naik, L. Sowards, M. O. Stone (2002) Biological infrared imaging and sensing. Micron 33:211-225.

Perception
Sensory systems
Temperature